Soukthavy Soundala (born 4 November 1995) is a Laotian footballer who plays for Master 7 FC.in Lao League 1 season 2022 He played for Laos national football team at the 2012 AFF Suzuki Cup. At only 17 years of age he came on for the injured Sengphachan Bounthisanh in the third minute in a 4-3 loss to Singapore. He played in two 2014 AFF Championship qualification matches in victories over Cambodia and East Timor.

References

1995 births
Living people
Laotian footballers
Laos international footballers
Association football goalkeepers
Place of birth missing (living people)
Footballers at the 2014 Asian Games
Asian Games competitors for Laos